Alan Davies (5 December 1961 – 4 February 1992) was an English-born Welsh international footballer who played as a right winger, although he could also play on the left. Davies began his football career with Manchester United, before spending time with Newcastle United, Charlton Athletic, Carlisle United, Swansea City (two spells) and Bradford City. Davies committed suicide in February 1992.

Career

Club career
Born in Manchester, Davies began his football career at Manchester United, turning professional in December 1978.

He made his senior debut for United on 1 May 1982, and made a total of 10 appearances for them, scoring one goal, in the first leg of their European Cup Winners' Cup semi-final against Juventus in April 1984. He made his final United appearance on 5 May 1984. He played in both games in the 1983 FA Cup Final when United defeated Brighton.

Davies then moved to Newcastle United and made 21 league appearances in his two seasons there, although he also had loan spells with Charlton Athletic and Carlisle United. He then transferred to Swansea City for the 1987–88 season.

Davies found much more success at Swansea, playing in 84 league matches in two seasons there, and scoring eight goals. He then transferred to Bradford City for a season in June 1989. After 26 league appearances and one goal for the Bantams, Davies returned to Swansea City, scoring a further four goals in 43 league appearances.

He committed suicide in 1992. A testimonial match in his memory was contested between Swansea City and Manchester United at the Vetch Field in August that year.

International career
Although he was born in England, Davies' parents were Welsh and he was therefore eligible to play for the Wales national football team. Davies won 13 caps for Wales in a seven-year international career.

Death
On 4 February 1992, after dropping his daughter off at school, Davies drove to Horton, and committed suicide by carbon monoxide poisoning.

At the inquest of fellow player Gary Speed, who was found hanged in November 2011, it was alleged that he and Speed had been "favourites" of convicted child-abuser Barry Bennell, though there was no suggestion they had been abused by Bennell.

Honours
FA Cup: 1982–83

References

1961 births
1992 deaths
Footballers from Manchester
Welsh footballers
Wales international footballers
Association football wingers
Manchester United F.C. players
Newcastle United F.C. players
Charlton Athletic F.C. players
Carlisle United F.C. players
Swansea City A.F.C. players
Bradford City A.F.C. players
English Football League players
Suicides in Wales
Wales under-21 international footballers
Suicides by carbon monoxide poisoning
1992 suicides
FA Cup Final players